Carl Friedrich Wilhelm Großmann (13 December 1863 – 5 July 1922) was a German serial killer, sexual predator, and alleged cannibal, though it was never proven that he cannibalized his victims. He committed suicide while awaiting the end of the main trial without giving a full confession, leaving the extent of his crimes and motives largely unknown.

Early life
Little is known about Carl Großmann's early life, except that he had sadistic sexual tastes and had several convictions for child molestation. As a young man, he served a 15-year prison sentence for fondling a ten-year-old girl and for brutally raping a four-year-old girl (who died shortly after the judgement).

During World War I, Großmann sold meat on the black market and even had a hot dog stand at a train station near his home. Some believed the meat contained the remains of his victims, as he threw some of their bones and other inedible parts into the river. Pieces of missing women were found in the canal near Andreas Square and off the Luisenstadt Canal, sometimes on a daily basis, which led some investigators to suspect that Großmann murdered up to 100 women and girls.

Arrest
On 21 August 1921, Großmann was arrested at his apartment in Berlin after neighbours heard screams and banging noises, followed by silence. The police burst into the apartment, finding on the bed the body of a young woman who had recently been murdered. Großmann was taken into custody and charged with first degree murder.

Neighbours reported that he seemed to have had a steady supply of female companions, mostly destitute-looking young women, over the previous few years. Many went into the apartment, but few emerged from it. How many lives Großmann took is not known. Only the body of his final victim was found, along with bloodstains in the apartment that indicated at least three other persons had been butchered in the few weeks leading up to his arrest.

One 1921 report claims Großmann had confessed to about twenty murders over twenty years. A 1922 report claims that Großmann had admitted to killing four women. Some have suggested as many as 50 women entered Großmann's apartment and ended up being murdered and dismembered.

Großmann was not convicted of murder, because he hanged himself in his prison cell before the end of the main trial.

Bibliography 
 Matthias Blazek (2009), Carl Großmann und Friedrich Schumann – Zwei Serienmörder in den zwanziger Jahren, Ibidem-Verlag, Stuttgart, .
 Horst Bosetzky (2004), Die Bestie vom Schlesischen Bahnhof, Jaron-Verlag, Berlin, .
 Peter Haining (2005), Cannibal Killers Murderers who kill and eat their victims, chapter: "The Bread And Butter Brides", Magpie Books, UK, .
 Maria Tatar (1995), Lustmord: Sexual Murder in Weimar Germany, Princeton, NJ (English), .
 Masters, R.E.L.; Lea, Eduard; Edwardes, Allen, (1963), Perverse Crimes in History: Evolving Concepts of Sadism, Lust-Murder, and Necrophilia from Ancient to Modern Times, NY: Julian Press

References

See also
Karl Denke
List of German serial killers

1863 births
1922 deaths
1922 suicides
20th-century German criminals
Criminals from Brandenburg
German murderers of children
German people convicted of child sexual abuse
German people convicted of murder
German people who died in prison custody
German prisoners sentenced to death
German rapists
German serial killers
Male serial killers
People convicted of murder by Germany
People from Neuruppin
People from the Province of Brandenburg
Prisoners sentenced to death by Germany
Prisoners who died in German detention
Serial killers who committed suicide in prison custody
Suicides by hanging in Germany